Mazenod is a community council located in the Maseru District of western Lesotho. The population in 2006 was 27,553. It is located to the south-east of the capital Maseru. Points of interest include Moshoeshoe I International Airport, Lesotho's only international airport.

Education
Mazenod High School is a high school for boys and girls and boarding school for girls. Four Sisters of the Holy Names minister here as principal and teachers.

Health care
Paki Health Centre provides nursing care, a well baby clinic, village health care workers and distribution of food to the needy.

Villages
The community of Mazenod includes the villages of Baloing, Bothoba-Pelo, Fika-Le-Mohala, Folobanka, Ha 'Masana, Ha Au, Ha Chaka, Ha Cheboko, Ha Jimisi, Ha Jimisi (Taung), Ha Josiase, Ha Khele, Ha Khitione, Ha Lekhobanyane, Ha Malefane, Ha Mantšebo, Ha Maphatšoe, Ha Masenkane, Ha Matebesi, Ha Moalosi, Ha Mohasoa, Ha Motemekoane, Ha Motheo, Ha Mpo, Ha Nkopane, Ha Ntsane, Ha Paki, Ha Pita, Ha Pomela, Ha Pshatlella, Ha Ralikoebe, Ha Ramorakane, Ha Sekepe, Ha Selonyane, Ha Seqhatsi, Ha Setho, Ha Teko, Ha Teko (Matebeleng), Ha Thaabe, Ha Thabe, Ha Thokoa, Ha Tseka, Lithakoaneng, Machekoaneng, Ha Chaka,Ha Ngoatonyane, Ha Nko, Ha Rasebesoane, Ha Luka, Ha Takalimane, Ha Tlebere, Matukeng, Moriting, Temaneng, Thata-Moli and Thot'a-Moli, Ha mphoto.

References

External links
 Google map of community villages

Populated places in Maseru District